The Stonestown River is a river in County Westmeath, and County Meath Ireland. The river originates near Clonmellon, on the Meath side of the border, before flowing into Westmeath. The river then re-enters Meath and flows into the River Boyne.

References 

Rivers of County Meath
Rivers of County Westmeath